John Lloyd and Wendy Turnbull successfully defended their title, defeating Steve Denton and Kathy Jordan in the final, 6–3, 6–3 to win the mixed doubles tennis title at the 1984 Wimbledon Championships.

Seeds

  John Lloyd /  Wendy Turnbull (champions)
  Steve Denton /  Kathy Jordan (final)
  Dick Stockton /  Anne Smith (third round)
  Mike Estep /  Martina Navratilova (quarterfinals)
  Kevin Curren /  Andrea Temesvári (quarterfinals)
  Vijay Amritraj /  Billie Jean King (withdrew)
   Sherwood Stewart /  Elizabeth Sayers (semifinals)
  Marty Riessen /  Anne Hobbs (quarterfinals)

Draw

Finals

Top half

Section 1

Section 2

Bottom half

Section 3

Section 4

References

External links

1984 Wimbledon Championships – Doubles draws and results at the International Tennis Federation

X=Mixed Doubles
Wimbledon Championship by year – Mixed doubles